Angoulême Charente Football Club, commonly known as Angoulême, is a French football club from the city of Angoulême, currently playing in Championnat National 2. Founded in 1920 as SC Angoulême, the club is well known as AS Angoulême, a name the club bore from 1948 to 1992. In 2005, they rebranded as Angoulême Charente FC.

Current squad

Managerial history

References

External links

 
Association football clubs established in 1920
1920 establishments in France
Football clubs in Nouvelle-Aquitaine
Angoulême
Sport in Charente
Ligue 1 clubs